The Rabbis Sing is the final original Rabbis' Sons album. It was released under the group name Baruch Chait and Old Friends. It saw a return to the robust harmonies of the original two albums as Itzy Weinberger rejoined the group and Yechiel Eckstein (who previously worked with Chait in Kol Salonika) filled the vocal part that was usually occupied by Label Sharfman. This was the only Rabbis' Sons' album to include music written by Shlomo Carlebach. It was also the only album to feature a song with English lyrics.

Track listing

References
 The Rabbis Sing at FAU Jewish Sound Archives
 The Rabbis Sing at DJSA (Free registration)
 Kol Salonika (vol. 1) at DJSA (Free registration)

Hasidic music
Jewish music albums
1974 albums